Satyricon is a chamber opera by Bruno Maderna with a libretto adapted by  and the composer from Petronius's Satyricon. It was written during Maderna's last illness in 1973 and premièred as part of the Holland Festival on 16 March 1973, in Scheveningen, Netherlands.

The work consists of 16 unordered numbers (with the option of placing taped numbers between them) and the collage effect extends to the music, which relies heavily on pastiche. It is uncertain to what extent this "open" form was a product of the composer's inclination to semi-improvisational music theatre, or to the urgency of composition at a time when Maderna's terminal illness was increasingly becoming evident. There are four singers, employing respectively English and German, French, wordless vocalise, and Latin: the host Trimalchio (tenor, doubling as the merchant Habinnas), his wife Fortunata (mezzo-soprano), Criside (soprano), and Eumolpus (bass). At its premiere, the role of Fortunata was created by Débria Brown. It is suggested that tape music may be used between scenes; the 2004 production in Darmstadt included dialogue and a number of additional spoken roles.(

References

Sources

 Reprinted as

Further reading

 Knessl, Lothar. 2001. "Zu Bruno Madernas Satyricon". In Stimme und Wort in der Musik des 20. Jahrhunderts, edited by Hartmut Krones. Wiener Schriften zur Stilkunde und Aufführungspraxis: Sonderreihe "Symposien zu Wien Modern" 1. Vienna: Böhlau, 2001. 
 Maderna, Bruno. 1992. Satyricon. Salambert SCD9101. Paul Sperry, Milagro Vargas, Liliana Oliveri, Aurio Tomicich, conducted by Sandro Gorli, Divertimento Ensemble.
 Maderna, Bruno. 2003. "Entretien à la radio hollandaise NOS après le Satyricon", French translation by Laurent Feneyrou. In Musique et dramaturgie: Esthétique de la représentation au XXe siècle, edited by Laurent Feneyrou, 595–598. Esthétique 7. Paris: Publications de la Sorbonne. . Originally published in Italian in Bruno Maderna: Documenti, edited by Mario Baroni, Rossana Dalmonte, and Francesca Magnani. Atti del Convegno Internazionale Bruno Maderna. Milan: Suvini Zerboni, 1985.
 Mathon, Geneviève. 1997. "Une esthétique de la fragmentation: Le Satyricon de Bruno Maderna". Les Cahiers du CIREM, nos. 40–41 (September): 166–170.
 Mathon, Geneviève. 2003. "À propos du Satyricon de Bruno Maderna". In Musique et dramaturgie: Esthétique de la représentation au XXe siècle, edited by Laurent Feneyrou, 571–593. Esthétique 7. Paris: Publications de la Sorbonne. 
 Poel, Piet Hein van de. 2003. "Bruno Maderna sur le Satyricon: 'Pop art' en musique", translated by Rosalie Siblesz. In Musique et dramaturgie: Esthétique de la représentation au XXe siècle, edited by Laurent Feneyrou, 599–601. Esthétique 7. Paris: Publications de la Sorbonne. 

Operas by Bruno Maderna
1973 operas
Operas
Chamber operas
Multiple-language operas
Operas set in antiquity
Operas based on novels
Works based on the Satyricon